Vladimir Kajzelj (5 June 1905 – 4 June 1972) was a Slovenian cross-country skier. He competed in the men's 18 kilometre event at the 1924 Winter Olympics.

References

1905 births
1972 deaths
Slovenian male cross-country skiers
Olympic cross-country skiers of Yugoslavia
Cross-country skiers at the 1924 Winter Olympics
Skiers from Ljubljana